Georg Gerle (1520–1591) was a Renaissance luthier specialising in lutes, from Füssen, Germany. He worked in Northern Italy and in Austria. His instruments survive at the Kunsthistorisches Museum, Vienna, Austria.

References

Lute makers
German luthiers
1520 births
1591 deaths
People from Füssen